The 2004–05 Gamma Ethniki was the 22nd season since the official establishment of the third tier of Greek football in 1983. Thrasyvoulos and Veria were crowned champions in Southern and Northern Group respectively, thus winning promotion to Beta Ethniki. Chaidari also won promotion as a best runner-up of the two groups.

Pamisos Messini, PANO Malia, Irodotos, Athinaida Kypselis, Marko, Pavlos Melas, Pandramaikos, Apollon Larissa and ILTEX Lykoi were relegated to Delta Ethniki.

Southern Group

League table

Northern Group

League table

Top scorers

References

Third level Greek football league seasons
3
Greece